National Route 120 is a national highway of Japan connecting Nikkō, Tochigi and Numata, Gunma in Japan, with a total length of 95.2 km (59.15 mi). A section of the highway is designated as a part of the Japan Romantic Road.

See also

References

External links

Former toll roads in Japan
120
Roads in Gunma Prefecture
Roads in Tochigi Prefecture